Diane Elizabeth Margetts (born 5 March 1955), known as Dee Margetts, is a former Australian politician. She was a member of the Australian Senate from 1993 to 1999 and a member of the Western Australian Legislative Council from 2001 to 2005, representing the Greens (WA).

Early life

Margetts was born in Fremantle and educated locally.

In 1979 she left Australia to study in the United Kingdom where she completed an Honours Degree in Development Studies at the University of East Anglia in 1982.

Margetts then returned to Australia to complete a Diploma in Education at the University of Western Australia and was a teacher and librarian at high schools until 1988, when she became Coordinator for People for Nuclear Disarmament, a position which she held until 1991.

Political career

In the 1989 state election, Margetts stood as a candidate for the Alternative Coalition, a precursor to the Greens, in the seat of Fremantle. At the 1990 federal election, Margetts stood as a Greens candidate for the seat of Swan. In 1991, Margetts stood as a candidate for the mayor of Perth in the local government elections, earning 9.5% of the vote.

Margetts was then elected to the Senate in 1993. She acted as Australian Greens Whip in the Senate from 25 May 1996 until 30 June 1999. She lost her seat at the 1998 federal election, and after 2 weeks in completing her Senate in mid 1999, she commenced her Masters Thesis on "Competition Policy, State Agreement Acts and the Public Interest" which was completed and approved in 2001.

Margetts was elected to the Western Australian state parliament in 2001, again losing her seat at the 2005 state election.  Due to her concerns about the major Australian policy change which had been pushed through in Federal Parliament in 1994, she commenced her research for a PhD at University of WA (UWA) in early 2006, which was completed and approved in 2013, "A Critique of Australia's National Competition Policy: Assessing its outcomes in a range of major sectors".

After politics
After politics, Margetts commenced a PhD at the University of Western Australia. Her thesis was the impacts of National Competition Policy, and she has written extensively on the area.

In 2012 Margetts was interviewed by Mary Anne Jebb for the Old Parliament House oral history project.

References

External links
Dee Margetts, Senate Biography

1955 births
Living people
Alumni of the University of East Anglia
Greens Western Australia members of the Parliament of Australia
Members of the Australian Senate for Western Australia
Members of the Western Australian Legislative Council
Australian anti–nuclear weapons activists
Women members of the Australian Senate
21st-century Australian politicians
21st-century Australian women politicians
20th-century Australian politicians
Women members of the Western Australian Legislative Council
20th-century Australian women politicians